There are lots of free software and many of them need donation and support to continue their works. There are some foundations to support these free software, and many organizations support these foundations. Knowing about these foundations and organizations might help in spending money in the right way and advancement of free software movement.

Foundations that support free software

References

Free software movement